The Icelandic Men's Hockey League, also known as Hertz deild karla for sponsorship reasons, is an ice hockey league in Iceland. As of the 2017–2018 season, it has four active teams. Its current champion is Skautafélag Akureyrar. It is run by Ice Hockey Iceland.

History
Hockey was first played in Iceland in around 1950, on ponds and rivers. The weather made it very hard to play, so Icelandic hockey did not develop for some time. In 1987, the first outdoor ice arena was built with an artificial surface, and a second was built three years later. The first indoor arena was built in 1997, and a second was built in 2000.

The league was formed in 1991, originally with three teams. The league season usually starts at the beginning of October and ends in March/April. As of 2018, there are three teams competing in the league.

Current teams

Former teams
 Skautafélagið Björninn (27 seasons: 1991–2018)
 Esja Reykjavík in Reykjavík (4 seasons: 2014–2018)
 Gulldrengir (1 season: 2000–2001)
 Húnar, Björninn reserve team (3 seasons: 2011–2014)
 Narfi frá Hrísey (Narfi Íshokkí) in Hrísey (3 seasons: 2004–2006, 2007–2008)
 SR Fálkar, Skautafélag Reykjavíkur reserve team (2 season: 2012–2014)
 SA Jötnar, Skautafélag Akureyrar reserve team (5 seasons: 1994–1995, 2010–2014)

League Champions
 1991–1992 – Skautafélag Akureyrar
 1992–1993 – Skautafélag Akureyrar
 1993–1994 – Skautafélag Akureyrar
 1994–1995 – Skautafélag Akureyrar
 1995–1996 – Skautafélag Akureyrar
 1996–1997 – Skautafélag Akureyrar
 1997–1998 – Skautafélag Akureyrar
 1998–1999 – Skautafélag Reykjavíkur
 1999–2000 – Skautafélag Reykjavíkur
 2000–2001 – Skautafélag Akureyrar
 2001–2002 – Skautafélag Akureyrar
 2002–2003 – Skautafélag Akureyrar
 2003–2004 – Skautafélag Akureyrar
 2004–2005 – Skautafélag Akureyrar
 2005–2006 – Skautafélag Reykjavíkur
 2006–2007 – Skautafélag Reykjavíkur
 2007–2008 – Skautafélag Akureyrar
 2008–2009 – Skautafélag Reykjavíkur
 2009–2010 – Skautafélag Akureyrar
 2010–2011 – Skautafélag Akureyrar
 2011–2012 – Björninn
 2012–2013 – Skautafélag Akureyrar
 2013–2014 – Skautafélag Akureyrar
 2014–2015 – Skautafélag Akureyrar
 2015–2016 – Skautafélag Akureyrar
 2016–2017 – Esja Reykjavík
 2017–2018 – Skautafélag Akureyrar
 2018–2019 – Skautafélag Akureyrar
 2019–2020 - Season canceled due to the COVID-19 outbreak.
 2020–2021 – Skautafélag Akureyrar
 2021–2022 – Skautafélag Akureyrar
 2022–2023 –

Titles by team

See also
Icelandic Women's Hockey League

References

External links 
Icelandic Hockey League
Icelandic League details

Top tier ice hockey leagues in Europe